Field hockey at the 2007 Southeast Asian Games was held at the Hockey Stadium at the Queen Sirikit Sport Centre, Pathum Thani Province, Thailand.

Medal table

Medalists

External links
Southeast Asian Games Official Results

Field hockey
2007
2007 in field hockey
2007 Southeast Asian Games